Shatranj Ke Khilari, also subtitled and later internationally released with the translated title The Chess Players, is a 1977 Indian film written and directed by Satyajit Ray, based on Munshi Premchand's short story of the same name. Amjad Khan plays the role of Nawab Wajid Ali Shah, Nawab of Awadh, and Richard Attenborough enacts the role of General James Outram. The main cast includes actors Sanjeev Kumar and Saeed Jaffrey as the chess players. It also has Shabana Azmi, Farooque Shaikh, Farida Jalal, David Abraham, and Tom Alter. It has Amitabh Bachchan as the narrator. This is the only full-length Hindi feature film of filmmaker Satyajit Ray. He  later made a short Hindi film for TV named Sadgati, another adaptation of Munshi Premchand's short story.

Summary
The film is set in 1856 on the eve of the Indian rebellion of 1857. The British are about to annex the  Oudh State (also spelled Awadh). The daily life of two wealthy men who are devoted to chess is presented against the background of scheming officials of the British East India Company, the history of its relations with the Indian ruler of Awadh, and the ruler's devotion both to his religious practice and the pursuit of pleasure.

The Chess Players employed stars of the Bombay cinema (Amjad Khan, Shabana Azmi and Amitabh Bachchan as a narrator) together with British actors (such as Richard Attenborough).

It was India's entry for the Best Foreign Language Film at the 51st Academy Awards, but did not receive a nomination.

Plot
The film shows in parallel the historical drama of the Indian princely state of Awadh (whose capital is Lucknow) and its Nawab, Wajid Ali Shah who is overthrown by the British, alongside the story of two noblemen who are obsessed with shatranj, i.e., chess.

Amjad Khan plays the ruling Nawab of Awadh, Wajid Ali Shah. He is a languid artist and poet, no longer in command of events and unable to effectively oppose the British demand for his throne. Parallel to this wider drama is the personal (and humorous) tale of two rich, indolent noblemen of this kingdom, Mirza Sajjad Ali and Mir Roshan Ali. Inseparable friends, the two nobles are passionately obsessed with the game of shatranj (chess). Both effectively neglect their wives and fail to fight the takeover of their kingdom by the East India Company. Instead, they escape their harangued wives and responsibilities, fleeing from Lucknow to play chess in a tiny village untouched by greater events. Ray's basic theme in the film is the message that the self-centredness, detachment and cowardice of India's ruling classes catalysed the annexation of Awadh by a handful of British officials.

The role of Captain Weston, so British in his ways, but in love with Urdu poetry, is also worth noting.

In the last scene, after which Mir shoots at Mirza and complains out loud "(If you die) I won't have a partner to play chess with", Mirza responds to him "but you have one in front of you!" (thus making him understand that he forgives him). He finally concludes that "after nightfall, we will go back home. We both need darkness to hide our faces."

Cast
Sanjeev Kumar as Mirza Sajjad Ali
Saeed Jaffrey as Mir Roshan Ali
Shabana Azmi as Khurshid, Mirza's wife
Richard Attenborough as General James Outram
Farida Jalal as Nafisa, Mir's wife
Amjad Khan as Wajid Ali Shah
David Abraham as Munshi Nandlal
Victor Banerjee as Prime Minister ("Madar-ud-Daula")
Veena as the Queen, Mother of Wajid Ali Shah.
Farooq Sheikh as Aqueel
Tom Alter as Captain Weston, Outram's aide de camp
Leela Mishra as Hirya, Khurshid's maid
Saswati Sen as Kathak dancer in the song 'Kanha main tose haari'	
Samarth Narain as Kallu
Bhudo Advani as Abbajani
Agha as Chuttan Miyan - Abbajani's attendant - (Uncredited)
Barry John
Kamu Mukherjee
Amitabh Bachchan as Narrator

Reception
The film was well received upon its release. Despite the film's limited budget, The Washington Post critic Gary Arnold gave it a positive review; "He [Ray] possesses what many overindulged Hollywood filmmakers often lack: a view of history". According to Martin Scorsese, "This film deals with a moment of incredible change in Indian history and is told from a comical view that is a hallmark of Ray’s work. Watching it again, I realize this is what it must really feel like to live through a moment of historic change. It feels this big and tragic at the same time."

Awards and nominations

Preservation

The Chess Players was preserved by the Academy Film Archive in 2010.

See also
 List of Asian historical drama films
 List of submissions to the 51st Academy Awards for Best Foreign Language Film
 List of Indian submissions for the Academy Award for Best International Feature Film

References

Further reading
Satyajit Ray, The Chess Players and Other Screenplays. London: Faber and Faber, 1989. 
Andrew Robinson, "Satyajit Ray's The Chess Players", History Today, July 2007

External links

1977 films
1970s Hindi-language films
Films directed by Satyajit Ray
Films about chess
Chess in India
Films based on short fiction
Films set in the British Raj
Films set in Lucknow
Adaptations of works by Premchand
Films whose cinematographer won the Best Cinematography National Film Award
Films set in the 1850s
Films with screenplays by Satyajit Ray
Indian films with live action and animation
Films scored by Satyajit Ray
Films about the Indian Rebellion of 1857
Best Hindi Feature Film National Film Award winners
Films shot in Lucknow
Cultural depictions of Indian monarchs
Films based on works by Premchand